Adriano Capuzzo (11 August 1927 – 15 December 2011) was an Italian equestrian. He competed in two events at the 1956 Summer Olympics.

References

1927 births
2011 deaths
Italian male equestrians
Olympic equestrians of Italy
Equestrians at the 1956 Summer Olympics
Sportspeople from Rome